Ryan Lance is an American businessman. He serves as the chairman and chief executive officer of ConocoPhillips.

Biography

Early life
Graduated from Great Falls High School in Great Falls, Montana. He received a Bachelor of Science in Petroleum Engineering from Montana Tech of the University of Montana in Butte, Montana.

Career
He started his career with ARCO Alaska in 1984. In 1989, he moved to the ARCO operations in Bakersfield, California. In 1992, he transferred to Midland, Texas, to work on ARCO's coalbed methane operations in the San Juan Basin. In 1994, he returned to Alaska as exploration engineering manager. From 1996 to 1998, he worked for Vastar Resources (a spin-off from ARCO, later merged with Amoco, and finally BP) in Houston, Texas, as planning manager. In 1998, he served as vice president of the Western North Slope for ARCO Alaska. In 2001, he returned to Houston as the general manager of Lower 48 and Canadian operations for the Phillips Petroleum Company. Upon the merger between Conoco, Inc. and Phillips Petroleum Company in 2002, he became Vice President Lower 48 for ConocoPhillips.  He has been chairman and CEO of ConocoPhillips since May 2012.

He serves on the boards of directors of Spindletop International, the American Petroleum Institute and the Independent Petroleum Association of America. He is a member of the Society of Petroleum Engineers.

He sits on the advisory board of his alma mater, Montana Technological University.

References

Living people
Year of birth missing (living people)
Montana Technological University alumni
American chief executives of energy companies
ConocoPhillips people
ARCO
Amoco
People from Great Falls, Montana